Ivica Rajković (born 24 March 1935) is a Croatian cinematographer.

Earlier in his career, Rajković worked as a photographer for Jadran Film, and later as an assistant to Tomislav Pinter. Rajković shot a total of 20 featured films, three television series, approximately 80 documentary films, and more than 3000 commercials.

Rajković received a Golden Arena for Best Cinematography in 1968 and a Vladimir Nazor Award for Life Achievement in Film in 2012.


Selected filmography

Feature films
 Protest (1967)
 Gravitation (1968)
 I Have Two Mothers and Two Fathers (1968)
 Accidental Life (1969)
 One Song a Day Takes Mischief Away (1970)
 The Rat Savior (1976)
 Train in the Snow (1976)
 Court Martial (1978)
 The Secret of Nikola Tesla (1980)

Documentaries
 From 3 to 22 (1966)

Sources
Rajković Ivica at filmski-programi.hr 
Rajković, Ivica at enciklopedija.hr 
Čovjek kojem je vjerovao Orson Welles 
Izložba: Iz filmskog albuma Ivice Rajkovića

External links

1935 births
Croatian cinematographers
People from Udbina
Golden Arena winners
Vladimir Nazor Award winners
Living people